Gerda Maureen Nicolson (11 November 1937 – 12 June 1992) was an Australian theatre and television actress best known for several long-running television roles. She was best known for playing Governor Ann Reynolds of the Wentworth Detention Centre in soap opera Prisoner.

Early life

Gerda Maureen Nicolson was born in Hobart, Tasmania, to parents both involved in theatre. In 1959, she travelled to London with her parents and attended many stage performances.

Career
On returning to Australia in 1961, Gerda joined Melbourne University's Graduate Society and acted in a number of its amateur stage plays while working as a draughtsperson at the Victorian Health Department. A year later, she was spotted by a director who encouraged her to audition for a stage play, A Woman in a Dressing Gown. Scoring one of the main roles, she joined the ensemble on its tour of Australia and New Zealand. Nicolson later said that the producer awarded her with the role on account of her stunning legs.

She was in The Proposal and the Bear for ABC TV.

Nicolson first reached wider audiences through her long-running role in Australian Broadcasting Corporation daily soap opera Bellbird. After leaving that series she had a regular role in the police drama Bluey (1976) and also The Sullivans (1976) and a small guest role in Cop Shop. 

Her most widely recognised role was as Governor Ann Reynolds in the popular Australian television soap opera Prisoner. This was her second role in the show — she had already played a minor role as a corrupt officer at another prison in earlier episodes. Nicolson played the role of Ann Reynolds from 1983 until the series ended in 1986. The series found huge international cult success in the 1990s and 2000s. Nicolson also appeared in Neighbours in 1989 as Robyn Taylor, who almost had an affair with Harold Bishop.

She collapsed in her dressing room prior to going to stage for theatre performance Mary Lives! in 1992. Although she was rushed to hospital, she never regained consciousness and died on 12 June. The cause of death was a brain-related haemorrhage.

Legacy 
Green Room Award: The Gerda Nicolson Award (for an Emerging Actress) was instituted in her name to commemorate her work in Australian theatre, as she is recognised as one of Victoria's finest female actors. This award, protected by The Green Room Awards Association, was presented to the recipient by her widower until his death in 2006. Recipients included; Alison Whyte, Peta Brady and Kat Stewart.

Gerda Nicolson Award for Indigenous female students studying at the Victorian College of the Arts in the areas of performing arts. This award was hosted through the Willan Centre for an undergraduate student.

Filmography

Film

Television

Television film

Awards 
 Penguin Best Sustained Performance (1985) for Prisoner

Nominated 
 Logie Best Supporting Actress (1977) for Bluey
 Logie Best Supporting Actress (1985) for Prisoner

External links
 
 The Unofficial Gerda Nicolson Web Pages

1937 births
1992 deaths
Australian film actresses
Australian stage actresses
Australian television actresses
Actresses from Hobart
20th-century Australian actresses